RK Zaječar was a Serbian handball club based in Zaječar.

History
Founded in 1949, the club played in the Yugoslav Handball Championship for three seasons from 1984 to 1987. They returned to the top flight in the 1989–90 season, but were promptly relegated.

In 2012, the club earned promotion to the Serbian Handball Super League. They also reached the Serbian Handball Cup final in the 2012–13 season, losing to Partizan.

Sponsorship
During its history, the club has been known by a variety of names due to sponsorship reasons:
 Kristal Zaječar

Notable players
The list includes players who played for their respective national teams in any major international tournaments, such as the Olympic Games, World Championships and European Championships:
  Vuk Lazović
  Marko Krsmančić

Head coaches
  Zlatko Krsmančić
  Aleksandar Radosavljević

References

External links
 RK Zaječar at srbijasport.net 

Zajecar
Handball clubs established in 1949
1949 establishments in Yugoslavia
Handball clubs disestablished in 2013
2013 disestablishments in Serbia
Sport in Zaječar